is a Japanese anime director, born on October 10, 1955, in Chiba Prefecture. In 1988, he started using his name in katakana.

Works
 Arashi no Yoru ni: Himitsu no Tomodachi
 Bakusō Kyōdai Let's & Go!!
 Bubu Chacha
 DT Eightron
 Hiwou War Chronicles
 Hutch the Honeybee 
 Idol Densetsu Eriko
 Iria: Zeiram the Animation
 Macross 7
 Macross 7: The Galaxy's Calling Me!
 Macross Dynamite 7
 Rainbow Days
 Shiki
 Shippū! Iron Leaguer

References

External links
 アミノテツロー資料館

1955 births
Living people
Anime directors
People from Chiba Prefecture
Sunrise (company) people
Macross
Japanese animators
Japanese animated film directors
Japanese television directors